CFEP-FM is a Canadian radio station broadcasting in the Halifax, Nova Scotia market and licensed to the inner suburb of Eastern Passage at 105.9 MHz. It provides a community radio service. The station was nominated in 2002, 2003, 2004, 2005 and 2006 as East Coast Radio Station of the Year by the East Coast Music Association.

The station began broadcasting in 2002.

On June 3, 2008, CFEP applied to the CRTC to amend the licence by changing the frequency from 94.7 MHz to 105.9 MHz. That application to move to 105.9 MHz was approved on August 19, 2008. On March 13, 2009, CFEP moved from 94.7 to 105.9 FM.

CFEP is a member of the National Campus and Community Radio Association.

References

External links
105.9 Seaside FM
 

FEP
FEP
Radio stations established in 2002
2002 establishments in Nova Scotia